Vojvoda Zimonić is a village in Serbia. It is situated in the Kanjiža municipality, in the North Banat District, Vojvodina province. The village has a Hungarian ethnic majority and its population numbering 340 people (2002 census).

Name
Formerly, the village was known as Zimonić (Зимонић) or Zimonjić (Зимоњић).

Ethnic groups (2002 census)

Hungarians = 185 (54.41%)
Serbs = 152 (44.71%)
Germans = 1 (0.29%)
undeclared = 2 (0.59%)

Historical population

1961: 587
1971: 529
1981: 383
1991: 282
2002: 340

See also
List of places in Serbia
List of cities, towns and villages in Vojvodina

References

Further reading
Slobodan Ćurčić, Broj stanovnika Vojvodine, Novi Sad, 1996.

Places in Bačka
Populated places in North Banat District
Kanjiža